Jada Shanice Stinson (born September 28, 1999) is a Puerto Rican basketball player.

Stinson plays for the Puerto Rican national team. She participated at the 2021 Centrobasket Women’s Championship. Stinson played for the Puerto Rican team at the 2020 Tokyo Olympics for the team's debut Olympics appearance.

Life 
Stinson is a native of Fayetteville, North Carolina. She attended Elizabethtown High School in Elizabethtown, Kentucky.

She plays college basketball for the Illinois State Redbirds. She previously played for the Memphis Tigers and Arkansas State Red Wolves.

References

External links
Memphis Tigers bio
Arkansas State Red Wolves bio
Illinois State Red Birds bio

1999 births
Living people
Basketball players at the 2020 Summer Olympics
Basketball players from Kentucky
Basketball players from North Carolina
Arkansas State Red Wolves women's basketball players
Elizabethtown High School alumni
Forwards (basketball)
Illinois State Redbirds women's basketball players
Memphis Tigers women's basketball players
Olympic basketball players of Puerto Rico
People from Elizabethtown, Kentucky
Puerto Rican women's basketball players
Sportspeople from Fayetteville, North Carolina